The 2012 United States presidential election in Georgia took place on November 6, 2012, as part of the 2012 General Election in which all 50 states plus the District of Columbia participated. Georgia voters chose 16 electors to represent them in the Electoral College via a popular vote pitting incumbent Democratic President Barack Obama and his running mate, Vice President Joe Biden, against Republican challenger and former Massachusetts Governor Mitt Romney and his running mate, Congressman Paul Ryan.

Romney won Georgia by a 7.82% margin, an improvement from 2008 when John McCain won by 5.2%. Romney received 53.30% of the vote to Obama's 45.48%. This is the last election in which Georgia backed a losing presidential candidate. Early County flipped from supporting the Republican candidate to the Democratic candidate, while Chattahoochee flipped from the Democratic column to the Republican column. Obama thus became the first Democrat to win the White House without carrying Chattahoochee County since Lyndon B. Johnson in 1964.

Along with Arizona, Georgia is one of only two states to vote for Joe Biden in the 2020 presidential election, that also voted against Obama in both 2008 and 2012. Obama is the only Democrat to ever win two terms without ever carrying Georgia. As of 2020, this is the last time a Democratic presidential nominee won the rural Black Belt counties of Baker, Dooly, Early, Peach, Quitman, and Twiggs. However, this was also the last time the suburban Atlanta counties of Gwinnett, Henry, and Cobb would vote Republican in a presidential race. This was also the first election since 1980 in which Georgia voted to the left of Missouri, and the last time that Georgia voted to the right of Ohio or Iowa as of 2020. Obama is also the most recent candidate to win without carrying the state and he is also the only Democrat to win without carrying Georgia once. As well as the first for either parties since 1952 and 1956.

Primaries

Democratic
Incumbent president Barack Obama was unopposed in the Georgia primary, therefore winning all of the state's delegates.

Republican

The 2012 Georgia Republican primary took place on March 6, 2012.

Georgia has 76 delegates to the Republic National Convention. The three super delegates are awarded winner-take-all to the statewide winner. Thirty-one delegates are awarded proportionately among candidates winning at least 20% of the vote statewide. Another 42 delegates are allocated by Congressional district, 3 delegates for each district. If a candidate gets a majority in a district, he wins all 3 delegates. If no one get majority, the delegates are split 2 and 1 between the top two candidates respectively.

General election

Candidate ballot access
 Mitt Romney/Paul Ryan, Republican
 Barack Obama/Joseph Biden, Democratic
 Gary Johnson/James P. Gray, Libertarian
Write-in candidate access:
 Jill Stein/Cheri Honkala, Green
 Virgil Goode/Jim Clymer, Constitution
 Rocky Anderson/Luis J. Rodriguez, Justice

Results
Out of a total of 6,066,961 registered voters at the time of the presidential election, turnout for the general election was 3,908,369, or 64.42% of registered voters.

By county

Counties that flipped from Democratic to Republican 

 Chattahoochee (largest city: Cusseta)

Counties that flipped from Republican to Democratic 
 Early (largest city: Blakely)

By congressional district
Romney won 10 of 14 congressional districts, including one that elected a Democrat.

See also 
2012 Democratic Party presidential primaries
2012 Republican Party presidential primaries
Republican Party presidential debates, 2012
 Results of the 2012 Republican Party presidential primaries
 Georgia Democratic Party
 Georgia Republican Party

References

External links
The Green Papers: for Georgia
The Green Papers: Major state elections in chronological order

2012
United States president
Georgia